The R402 is a Regional Route in South Africa that connects the N2 between Stormsrivier and Humansdorp with the R62 between Humansdorp and Joubertina.

External links
 Routes Travel Info

References

Regional Routes in the Eastern Cape